Vaddanam is a gold ornamental belt worn by South Indian women on special occasions.  

These occasions can include festival days, major family occasions, and weddings.  like marriages as a status symbol in South India.  A Vaddanam is one of the heaviest ornaments worn by a bride. A South Indian marriage is rarely seen without the bride wearing one.

References

Indian traditions
Jewellery of India
Tamil culture
South India
Culture of Andhra Pradesh